Corophiidae is a family of amphipods, containing the following genera:

Americorophium Bousfield & Hoover, 1997
Anonychocheirus Moore & Myers, 1983
Apocorophium Bousfield & Hoover, 1997
Bathyphotis Stephensen, 1944
Chaetocorophium (Hurley, 1954)Cheirimedeia J. L. Barnard, 1962Cheiriphotis Walker, 1904Chelicorophium Bousfield & Hoover, 1997ComachoCorophium Latreille, 1806Crassicorophium Bousfield & Hoover, 1997Eocorophium Bousfield & Hoover, 1997Goesia Boeck, 1871Hansenella Chevreux, 1909Haplocheira Haswell, 1879Hirayamaia Bousfield & Hoover, 1997Kuphocheira K. H. Barnard, 1931Laticorophium Bousfield & Hoover, 1997Leptocheirus Zaddach, 1884Lobatocorophium Bousfield & Hoover, 1997Medicorophium Bousfield & Hoover, 1997Microcorophium Bousfield & Hoover, 1997Monocorophium Bousfield & Hoover, 1997Neohela S. I. Smith, 1881Paracorophium Stebbing, 1899Pareurystheus Tzvetkova, 1977Plumiliophotis Myers, 2009Protomedeia Krøyer, 1842Pseudunciola Bousfield, 1973Sinocorophium Bousfield & Hoover, 1997Stenocorophium'' G. Karaman, 1979

References

External links
 crustacea.net: Description of family Corophiidae

Corophiidea
Crustacean families